B'nai Shalom Day School is an independent Jewish day school in Greensboro, North Carolina, United States.

The school was founded in August 1970 as a Solomon Schechter Day School and originally called the North Carolina Hebrew Academy at Greensboro.  In 1979, the name was changed to B’nai Shalom. In the 1980s, B’nai Shalom elected to join the Jewish Community Day School Network.

References

Jewish day schools
Jewish schools in the United States
Jewish day schools in the United States
Religious schools in North Carolina
Schools in Greensboro, North Carolina
Educational institutions established in 1970
1970 establishments in North Carolina
Jews and Judaism in North Carolina